Isovitexin (or homovitexin, saponaretin) is a flavone. the apigenin-6-C-glucoside. In this case, the prefix 'iso' does not imply an isoflavonoid (the position of the B-ring on the C-ring), but the position of the glucoside on the flavone.

Natural occurrence 
It can be found in the passion flower, Cannabis, oat and the açaí palm.

Metabolism 
 Isovitexin beta-glucosyltransferase

Glycosides 
Saponarin is the isovitexin-7-O-glucoside.

See also 
 Vitexin, the 8-C-glucoside of apigenin
 Isoorientin, the 3'-OH derivative

References 

Flavone glucosides
C-glycoside natural phenols